Agaristodes is a monotypic moth genus of the family Noctuidae erected by George Hampson in 1908. Its only species, Agaristodes feisthamelii, was first described by Gottlieb August Wilhelm Herrich-Schäffer in 1853. It is found in the Australian island state of Tasmania.

References

Agaristinae
Noctuoidea genera
Monotypic moth genera